Elsa Rabinowitz (September 21, 1929 – November 2, 2020), known professionally as Elsa Raven, was an American character actress, perhaps best known for her two years (1988–1990) on the sitcom Amen and playing the mother of Vincent Terranova (Ken Wahl) on the TV series Wiseguy.

Raven is also known for her small but memorable role in Back to the Future (1985) as the clock tower lady with her phrase "Save the clock tower!" while gathering local donations to preserve the clock, whose complimentary leaflet later proves invaluable in the past. She played Ida Straus in the 1997 film Titanic along with Lew Palter, who played Isidor Straus, and had a voice role in the 1981 animated film American Pop.

Raven adhered to Judaism. Raven died on November 2, 2020, in Los Angeles at the age of 91. Upon her death, she was cremated and her ashes returned to her family.

Filmography

Film appearances

TV appearances 
 Million Dollar Infield (1982) – Dr. Isabel Armen
 Quincy, M.E. (1978–1982) – Miss Beck – FDA / Miss Coroner Judge / Nurse Angela Davenport
 The A-Team (1983–1984) – Clara Dickerson / Dr. Marian Ericson
 Highway to Heaven (1985) – Ms. Zabenko
 Family Ties (1986, episode 84 "Checkmate") – 'Mildred Atkins'
 General Hospital (1986) – Tessie
 Freddy's Nightmares (1988) – Mrs. Wildmon
 Amen (1989–1990) – Inga
 Wiseguy (1987–1990) – Carlotta Terranova Aiuppo
 Get a Life (1991) – Marta
 The Fresh Prince of Bel-Air (1992) – Ida Pollock
 Murphy Brown (1993) – Mrs. Kobolakis
 Sisters (1993) - Madam Sophie
 Seinfeld (1994) – Mom
 3rd Rock from the Sun (1999) – Aunt Florence
 Everybody Loves Raymond (2004) – Mrs. Lopman
 ER (2008) – Rosemary Smalls

References

External links

1929 births
2020 deaths
American film actresses
American voice actresses
American television actresses
Actresses from Charleston, South Carolina
20th-century American actresses
21st-century American actresses
Jewish American actresses
21st-century American Jews